H36 may refer to:
 Hanriot H.36, a French trainer aircraft
 Hoffmann H36, an Austrian motor glider
 , a Royal Navy A-class destroyer